Belloliva apoma is a species of sea snail, a marine gastropod mollusc in the family Bellolividae, the olives.

Description
The length of the shell attains 6 mm.

Distribution
This marine species occurs off New Caledonia

References

  Kantor Y.I. & Bouchet P. 2007. Out of Australia: Belloliva (Neogastropoda: Olividae) in the Coral Sea and New Caledonia. American Malacological Bulletin, 22(1-2): 22-73.

External links
 Gastropods.com: Belloliva apoma

Bellolividae
Gastropods described in 2007